State Road 880 (SR 880) is a  long state highway in Belle Glade, Florida, running from State Roads 80 and 15 east to State Road 717. From here, it continues east for almost  to Twenty Mile Bend as County Road 880 (CR 880).

Route description
State Road 880 begins on MLK Jr. Boulevard, where it heads east towards State Road 717, the eastern terminus. East of SR 717, the road continues east as County Road 880 to State Road 80 (US 98 / US 441) at Twenty Mile Bend.

History

The road is a former alignment of State Road 80, which now uses the Hooker Highway to the north.

County Road 880 was previously signed as State Road 880, and was transferred to county control on August 2, 1994.

Major intersections

References

External links

880
880
880
State highways in the United States shorter than one mile